William Emanuel Cobham Jr. (born May 16, 1944) is a Panamanian–American jazz drummer who came to prominence in the late 1960s and early 1970s with trumpeter Miles Davis and then with the Mahavishnu Orchestra.

He was inducted into the Modern Drummer Hall of Fame in 1987 and the Classic Drummer Hall of Fame in 2013. AllMusic biographer Steve Huey said, "Generally acclaimed as fusion's greatest drummer, Billy Cobham's explosive technique powered some of the genre's most important early recordings – including groundbreaking efforts by Miles Davis and the Mahavishnu Orchestra – before he became an accomplished bandleader in his own right. At his best, Cobham harnessed his amazing dexterity into thundering, high-octane hybrids of jazz complexity and rock & roll aggression."
 
Cobham's influence stretched far beyond jazz, including on progressive rock contemporaries like Bill Bruford of King Crimson and Danny Carey of Tool. Prince and Jeff Beck both played a version of Cobham's Stratus in concert. Phil Collins, who named Mahavishnu Orchestra's The Inner Mounting Flame as a key influence on his early style said, "Billy Cobham played some of the finest drumming I've ever heard on that record."

Biography
Born in Colón, Panama, Cobham moved with his family to Brooklyn, New York when he was three. His father, Manuel, worked as a hospital statistician during the week and played piano on weekends. Cobham started playing drums at age four and joined his father four years later. When he was fourteen, he got his first drum kit as a gift after being accepted to The High School of Music & Art in New York City. He was drafted in 1965, and for the next three years he played with a U.S. Army band.

After his discharge, he became a member of Horace Silver's quintet. He played an early model electric drum kit given to him by Tama Drums. He was a house drummer for Atlantic Records and a session musician for CTI and Kudu, appearing on the albums White Rabbit by George Benson, Sunflower by Milt Jackson, and Soul Box by Grover Washington Jr.

Cobham started the jazz rock group Dreams with Michael Brecker, Randy Brecker, Barry Rogers, and John Abercrombie. He moved further into jazz fusion when he toured with Miles Davis and recorded Davis's albums Bitches Brew and A Tribute to Jack Johnson. In 1971, he and guitarist John McLaughlin left Davis to start the Mahavishnu Orchestra, another group that fused rock, funk, and jazz. Cobham toured extensively from 1971 to 1973 with the Mahavishnu Orchestra, which released two studio albums, The Inner Mounting Flame (1971) and Birds of Fire (1973), and one live album, Between Nothingness & Eternity (1973). The studio versions of songs on the live album were released on The Lost Trident Sessions (1999).

Cobham's debut album, Spectrum (1973), surprised him and his record company when it reached No. 1 on the Billboard magazine Jazz Albums chart and No. 26 on the Top 200 Albums chart. Cobham started experimenting with different drum equipment. In 1974 for Crosswinds he used a fiberglass shell snare built for him by Al Duffy, and used Duffy's custom chain-drive bass drum pedal. Cobham's massive drum kit in the mid-1970s, based on a clear acrylic set by Fibes Drums, contained two Fibes bass drums, a custom Duffy snare, two flared-shell rack toms by North Drums, four Fibes rack toms, two Fibes floor toms, two gong drums by Duffy customized by Cobham's drum roadie Jeff Ocheltree, a hi-hat, five Zildjian cymbals, and one hanging 36-inch gong. This expansive kit and Cobham's dynamic style influenced later drummers.

In 1980, he worked with Jack Bruce in Jack Bruce & Friends. For this group, Cobham used a very large custom drum kit designed for him by Tama Drums, featuring three bass drums with linked pedals, and three snares including a piccolo snare and a Hinger Space Tone expanding snare. Cobham said this kit adapted to fit the music, and the music adapted to fit the kit – "a continual chicken–egg–chicken scenario." On October 30, 1980, he joined the Grateful Dead during the band's concert at Radio City Music Hall. He performed a long drum solo session with the band's two percussionists, Bill Kreutzmann and Mickey Hart, also known as the Rhythm Devils. In 1981, Billy Cobham's Glass Menagerie was formed with Michał Urbaniak on violin and EWI, Gil Goldstein on piano, Tim Landers on bass, and Mike Stern on guitar. Dean Brown replaced Stern when he left to play with Miles Davis. Glass Menagerie released two albums for Elektra Musician.

In 1984, he played in the band Bobby and the Midnites, a side project for Bob Weir of the Grateful Dead, with Bobby Cochran and Kenny Gradney, and recorded the album Where the Beat Meets the Street.

Cobham moved to Switzerland in 1985.

In 1994, he joined an all-star cast Greek Theatre in Los Angeles and the results appeared on the album Stanley Clarke, Larry Carlton, Billy Cobham, Najee and Deron Johnson Live at the Greek. The concert was predominantly Clarke's music, but all the musicians contributed material.

In 2006, Cobham released Drum 'n' Voice 2, a return to the 1970s jazz-funk sound, with guests including Brian Auger, Guy Barker, Jeff Berlin, Frank Gambale, Jan Hammer, Mike Lindup, Buddy Miles, Dominic Miller, Airto Moreira, John Patitucci, and the band Novecento. The album was produced and arranged by Pino and Lino Nicolosi for Nicolosi Productions. In 2009, he released Drum'n' Voice 3. Guests included Alex Acuña, Brian Auger, George Duke, Chaka Khan, Bob Mintzer, Novecento, John Scofield, and Gino Vannelli.

Cobham plays his drums using the open-handed technique, which allows the player to play without crossing their right hand over the snare drum.

In December 2011, Cobham began teaching drums online at the Billy Cobham School of Drums, a school in the ArtistWorks Drum Academy.

Praise from other musicians 
Many musicians have cited Cobham as an influence, including Kenny Aronoff, Steve Arrington, Ranjit Barot, Danny Carey, Jimmy Chamberlin, Dennis Chambers,  Brann Dailor, Matt Garstka, Chris Hornbrook, Thomas Lang, Mac McNeilly, OM, Opeth, Chris Pennie Mike Portnoy, Thomas Pridgen, Sivamani, Bill Stevenson, Jon Theodore, and Tony Thompson.

In addition, other musicians have been quoted expressing admiration for his work, including Steven Wilson, and Dave Bainbridge.
In an interview with NME, Drummer Ethan Torchio from the band Maneskin said that Cobham's Spectrum album was the first cd he ever purchased.

Discography

As leader

 1973 – Spectrum
 1974 – Crosswinds
 1974 – Total Eclipse
 1975 – Shabazz
 1975 – A Funky Thide of Sings
 1976 – Life & Times
1976 – Billy Cobham / George Duke: Live on Tour in Europe
 1977 – Magic
 1978 – Inner Conflicts
 1978 – Alivemutherforya
 1978 – Simplicity of Expression: Depth of Thought
 1979 – BC
 1980 – Flight Time
 1981 – Stratus
 1982 – Observations & Reflections
 1983 – Smokin' 
 1985 – Warning
 1986 – Powerplay
 1987 – Picture This
 1989 – Incoming
 1992 – By Design
 1994 – The Traveler
 1996 – Nordic
 1998 – Focused
 1999 – Off Color
 2000 – North by Northwest
 2001 – Drum & Voice 1 (All That Groove)
 2002 – Culture Mix 2003 – The Art of Three 2006 – Art of Four 2006 – Drum & Voice – Vol.2 2007 – Fruit from the Loom 2008 – De Cuba y Panama 2009 – Drum & Voice – Vol.3 2010 – Palindrome 2014 – Tales From The Skeleton Coast 2015 – Spectrum 40 Live 2016 – Drum & Voice – Vol.4 2017 – Red Baron 2022 – Drum & Voice – Vol.5As sideman

With Stanley Turrentine

 Sugar (CTI, 1970)

With Stanley Turrentine and Milt Jackson

 Cherry (CTI, 1972)

With Mose Allison
 Western Man (Atlantic, 1971)
 Lessons in Living (1982)

With Gene Ammons
 Got My Own (Prestige, 1972)
 Big Bad Jug (Prestige, 1973)

With Ray Barretto
 The Other Road (1973)
With Roberto Tola
 Kon Tiki (EBM, 2021)

With George Benson
 Giblet Gravy (1968) 
 White Rabbit (CTI, 1972)

With Bobby and the Midnites
 Bobby and the Midnites (1981)
 Where the Beat Meets the Street (1984)

With The Brothers Johnson
 Look Out for #1 (1976)

With James Brown
 Make It Funky: The Big Payback 1971-1975 (1996)

With Kenny Burrell
 Night Song (Verve, 1969)
 God Bless the Child (CTI, 1971)

With Cargo
 Cargo (1982)

With Ron CarterUptown Conversation (Embryo, 1970)
 Blues Farm (CTI, 1973)
 All Blues (CTI, 1973)
 Spanish Blue (CTI, 1974)
 Yellow & Green (CTI, 1976)
 New York Slick (Milestone, 1980)
 Empire Jazz (RSO, 1980)
With Stanley Clarke
 School Days (1976)
 Atlantis with George Duke (1973)
 Live at the Greek with Larry Carlton (1993)

With Larry Coryell
 Spaces (1974)
 The Essential Larry Coryell (1975)
 Spaces Revisited (1997)

With Miles Davis
 Bitches Brew (1970)
 Live-Evil (1970)
 A Tribute to Jack Johnson (1970)
 Big Fun (1974)
 Get Up with It (1974)
 Circle in the Round (1979) 
 Directions (recorded 11.3.1960-27.2.1970, released 1980)

With Richard DavisWay Out West (recorded 1977, Muse, 1980)Fancy Free (Galaxy, 1977)

With Eumir Deodato
 Prelude (1972)
 Deodato 2 (1973)
 Whirlwinds (1974)

With Dreams
 Dreams (1970)
 Imagine My Surprise (1971)

With Charles EarlandIntensity (Prestige, 1972)

With Gil EvansLive at the Public Theater (New York 1980) (Trio, 1981)

With Fania All Stars
 Our Latin Thing (1972)
 Yankee Stadium (1973)
 Latin-Soul-Rock (1974)

With Roberta Flack and Donny Hathaway
 Roberta Flack & Donny Hathaway (1980)

With Peter Gabriel
 Passion: Music for The Last Temptation of Christ (1989)

With Johnny HammondBreakout (Kudu, 1971)
 Wild Horses Rock Steady (Kudu, 1971)The Prophet (Kudu, 1972)
With Billy HarperCapra Black (Strata-East, 1973)

With Donald Harrison
 Heroes (Nagel Heyer, 2004)

With Freddie Hubbard
 Sky Dive (CTI, 1973)

With Jackie and Roy
 Time & Love (CTI, 1972)

With Milt Jackson
 Sunflower (CTI, 1972)

With Jazz Is Dead
 Blue Light Rain (Zebra, 1998)

With Quincy Jones
 The Anderson Tapes (1971)
 I Heard That!! (1976)
With Robin Kenyatta Gypsy Man (Atlantic, 1973)
With Hubert Laws
 Morning Star (CTI, 1972)
 Carnegie Hall (CTI, 1973)

With Mahavishnu Orchestra
 Inner Mounting Flame (1971)
 Birds of Fire (1973)
 Between Nothingness and Eternity (1973)
 The Best of Mahavishnu Orchestra (recorded 1971-1973, released 1980)
 The Lost Trident Sessions (recorded 1973, released 1999)
 Unreleased Tracks from Between Nothingness & Eternity (recorded 1973, released 2011)
 Mahavishnu (1984)

With Junior Mance
 With a Lotta Help from My Friends (Atlantic, 1970)

With Arif MardinJourney (Atlantic, 1974)

With Les McCannComment (Atlantic, 1970)
 Invitation to Openness (Atlantic, 1971)

With John McLaughlin
 My Goal's Beyond (Columbia, 1971)
 Love Devotion Surrender with Carlos Santana (Columbia, 1973)
 Electric Guitarist (Columbia, 1978)

With Mark-Almond Band
 Rising (1972)
 To the Heart (1976)
With Jimmy OwensHeadin' Home (A&M/Horizon, 1978)
With Sonny Rollins
 The Way I Feel (Milestone, 1976)
 Don’t Stop the Carnival (Milestone, 1978)

With Michel SardabyMichel Sardaby in New York (Sound Hills, 2002)

With Don Sebesky
 Giant Box (CTI, 1973)

With Horace Silver
 Serenade to a Soul Sister (1968)
 You Gotta Take a Little Love (1969)

With Carly Simon
 Hotcakes (1974)
With Lonnie SmithMama Wailer (Kudu, 1971)
With Gábor Szabó
 Mizrab (CTI, 1972)
With Leon ThomasThe Leon Thomas Album (Flying Dutchman, 1970)
With McCoy Tyner
 Fly with the Wind (Milestone, 1976)

With Miroslav Vitous
 Purple (1970)

With Grover Washington, Jr.
 All the King's Horses (Kudu, 1972)
 Soul Box (Kudu, 1973)

With Randy Weston
 Blue Moses'' (CTI, 1972)

References

External links

  – official site
 
 Billy Cobham at Drummerworld.com

1944 births
20th-century American drummers
African-American drummers
African-American jazz musicians
African-American rock musicians
American expatriates in Switzerland
American jazz drummers
American male drummers
American rock drummers
American session musicians
Atlantic Records artists
Fania Records artists
Bobby and the Midnites members
Jazz fusion drummers
Living people
Mahavishnu Orchestra members
New York Jazz Quartet members
Panamanian emigrants to the United States
People from Colón, Panama
The High School of Music & Art alumni
20th-century American male musicians
American male jazz musicians
Dreams (band) members
Jazz Is Dead members
Panamanian people of African descent
Jazz musicians from New York (state)
20th-century African-American musicians
21st-century African-American people